The 2000 United States presidential election in Texas took place on November 7, 2000, and was part of the 2000 United States presidential election. State voters chose 32 representatives, or electors, to the Electoral College, who voted for president and vice president.

Texas was won by the Republican Party candidate, the state's incumbent governor, George W. Bush, by a 21.32% margin of victory. This was the first time since 1928 that Cottle County voted Republican. Many counties that Bill Clinton won in 1996 swung towards Bush in this election, in part due to the increasingly conservative bent of rural areas and Bush's favorite son status within the state. Perhaps the most notable and surprising county to be won by Bush was the very liberal Travis County. Bush's win in the county is likely due to the somewhat strong showing of left-wing third-party candidate Ralph Nader, who got 10.37% of the vote on the Green ticket, his best showing in any Texas county. Had those voters voted for Gore, he would have narrowly won the county by 5.16% (52.04% to Bush's 46.88%). This would be the last time Travis County voted Republican, and the last time third-party candidates affected the results in that county as in 2004 and onward, the Democrats have increased their margins, culminating in Joe Biden's 71.41% win compared to Donald Trump's 26.43% of the vote in 2020.

Results

By county

Counties that flipped from Democratic to Republican
Atascosa (Largest city: Pleasanton)
Bastrop (Largest city: Elgin)
Baylor (Largest city: Seymour)
Bee (Largest city: Beeville)
Bexar (Largest city: San Antonio)
Bowie (Largest city: Texarkana)
Brewster (Largest city: Alpine)
Burleson (Largest city: Caldwell)
Caldwell (Largest city: Lockhart)
Camp (Largest city: Pittsburg)
Cass (Largest city: Atlanta)
Comanche (Largest city: Comanche)
Cottle (Largest city: Paducah)
Crosby (Largest city: Crosbyton)
Delta (Largest city: Cooper)
Dickens (Largest city: Spur)
Falls (Largest city: Marlin)
Fannin (Largest city: Bonham)
Fisher (Largest city: Rotan)
Foard (Largest city: Crowell)
Galveston (Largest city: Galveston)
Grimes (Largest city: Navasota)
Hall (Largest city: Memphis)
Hardeman (Largest city: Quanah)
Harrison (Largest city: Marshall)
Haskell (Largest city: Haskell)
Hopkins (Largest city: Sulphur Springs)
Hudspeth (Largest city: Fort Hancock)
Jasper (Largest city: Jasper)
Jones (Largest city: Abilene)
Karnes (Largest city: Kenedy)
Kent (Largest city: Jayton)
Kleberg (Largest city: Kingsville)
Knox (Largest city: Munday)
Limestone (Largest city: Mexia)
Marion (Largest city: Jefferson)
Menard (Largest city: Menard)
Milam (Largest city: Rockdale)
Mitchell (Largest city: Colorado City)
Navarro (Largest city: Corsicana)
Nolan (Largest city: Sweetwater)
Nueces (Largest city: Corpus Christi)
Orange (Largest city: Orange)
Palo Pinto (Largest city: Mineral Wells)
Panola (Largest city: Carthage)
Pecos (Largest city: Fort Stockton)
Rains (Largest city: Emory)
Red River (Largest city: Clarksville)
Refugio (Largest city: Refugio)
Sabine (Largest city: Milam)
San Augustine (Largest city: San Augustine)
San Patricio (Largest city: Portland)
Shelby (Largest city: Center)
Stonewall (Largest city: Aspermont)
Swisher (Largest city: Tulia)
Terrell (Largest city: Sanderson)
Titus (Largest city: Mount Pleasant)
Travis (Largest city: Austin)
Trinity (Largest city: Trinity)
Tyler (Largest city: Woodville)
Val Verde (Largest city: Del Rio)
Waller (Largest city: Hempstead)
Ward (Largest city: Monahans)

By congressional district
Bush won 20 of 30 congressional districts, including seven held by Democrats.

Analysis
The 2000 election in Texas was a very partisan election, with nearly 60% of voters voting for the Republican Party candidate. The third party vote shrunk to a total of 2.7%, likely because Ross Perot was not on the ballot that year. The vast majority of counties voted heavily for Governor Bush as his approval rating and popularity in the state was high. Many of the long time rural Democratic counties, including those in East Texas along the border of Louisiana, swung Republican as the national party moved further to the left. Texas Democrats are more moderate to conservative by national standards, and many had a favorable view towards Bush because of his bipartisan approach with the Democratic state legislature during his tenure as governor.

Bush carried 230 of Texas's 254 counties. He racked up big margins in the Texas Panhandle, East Texas, the Permian Basin, the Texas Hill Country, and the Gulf Coast. He won every major and mid-sized city with the exceptions of El Paso, Laredo, Brownsville, McAllen, and Beaumont, all of which were carried by Vice President Al Gore. Two thinly populated counties, Glasscock and Ochiltree, gave Bush over 90% of the vote, with the former being the strongest Republican voting county in 2000. This marked the first time since 1956 that a Republican candidate won any of Texas's counties with over 90% of the vote, and the first time since Texas native Lyndon B. Johnson in 1964 any candidate has done so.

Vice President Al Gore, the Democratic Party candidate, performed strongly in South Texas, which is composed of a heavy Latino population, and the city of El Paso. Three counties in East Texas voted for Gore by narrow margins: Jefferson, Morris, and Newton. This was the worst performance for a Democrat in East Texas since the 1984 election.

The Green Party candidate Ralph Nader, had his best performance in Travis County, home to the state capital Austin, winning 10.37% of the vote. , this is the last time a Republican won this liberal Democratic-leaning county. This is also the last time Robertson County, and the East Texas counties of Newton and Morris voted Democrat, leaving Jefferson, home of Beaumont and Port Arthur, as the sole Democratic stronghold in this region until Donald Trump won it in 2016.

Electors

The electors of each state and the District of Columbia met on December 18, 2000, to cast their votes for president and vice president. The Electoral College itself never meets as one body. Instead the electors from each state and the District of Columbia met in their respective capitols. 

The following were the members of the Electoral College from the state. All were pledged to and voted for George Bush and Dick Cheney:
Ernie Angelo
James R. Batsell
Carmen P. Castillo
Mary Ceverha
Ken Clark
Hally B. Clements
Mary E. Cowart
Sue Daniel
Michael Dugas
Betty R. Hines
Jim Hamlin
Cruz G. Hernandez
Chuck Jones
William Earl Juett
Neal J. Katz
Betsy Lake
Adair Margo
Loyce McCarter
Joseph I. Oniell III
Michael Paddie
Nancy Palm
Howard Pebley Jr.
Robert J. Peden
Helen Quiram
James B. Randall
Clyde Moody Siebman
Stan Stanart
Henry W. Teich Jr.
Randal Tye Thomas
James Davidson Walker
Tom F. Ward Jr.
Gayle West

See also
 United States presidential elections in Texas
 Presidency of George W. Bush

References

See also

Texas
2000
United States presidential